Walter Freshwater Pool (October 10, 1850 – August 25, 1883) was a United States representative from North Carolina.

Life
Pool was born at Elm Grove, near Elizabeth City, Pasquotank County, N.C., October 10, 1850.
He was the nephew of John Pool, who was Republican U.S. Senator from North Carolina between 1868 and 1873.
He attended the public school conducted by his family and the University of North Carolina at Chapel Hill. In 1870 he moved with his parents to Elizabeth City, N.C. He studied law, was admitted to the bar in 1873 and commenced practice in Elizabeth City.

Pool was elected as a Republican to the 48th United States Congress and served from March 4, 1883, until his death on August 25, 1883, in Elizabeth City (although Congress was not in session at the time). He was interred in the Pool Cemetery, near Elizabeth City.

See also
List of United States Congress members who died in office (1790–1899)

References
Biography from the Biographical Directory of the United States Congress.
Pool, Walter Freshwater at NCPedia

External links 
 

1850 births
1883 deaths
People from Pasquotank County, North Carolina
University of North Carolina at Chapel Hill alumni
Republican Party members of the United States House of Representatives from North Carolina
19th-century American politicians
People from Elizabeth City, North Carolina